The men's 4 × 200 metre freestyle relay event at the 2008 Olympic Games took place on 12–13 August at the Beijing National Aquatics Center in Beijing, China.

The U.S. men's team smashed both the seven-minute barrier and the world record to keep Michael Phelps' gold-medal streak alive and most importantly, to defend their Olympic title in the event. The American foursome of Phelps (1:43.31, the second fastest split in history), Ryan Lochte (1:44.28), Ricky Berens (1:46.29), and Peter Vanderkaay (1:44.68) blistered the field, and prevailed in a sterling time of 6:58.56 to shave off their standard by almost five seconds from the 2007 World Championships in Melbourne. Earlier in the prelims, Berens (1:45.47) and his teammates David Walters (1:46.57), Erik Vendt (1:47.11), and Klete Keller (1:45.51) registered a top-seeded time of 7:04.66 from heat two to demolish Australia's 2000 Olympic record by 2.39 seconds.

Russia's Nikita Lobintsev (1:46.64), Yevgeny Lagunov (1:46.56), Danila Izotov (1:45.86), and Alexander Sukhorukov (1:44.65) trailed behind the Americans by over five body lengths to take home the silver in a European record of 7:03.70. Meanwhile, Australia's Patrick Murphy (1:45.95), Grant Hackett (1:45.87), Grant Brits (1:47.13), and Nic Ffrost (1:46.03) picked up a bronze in 7:04.98 to hold off the agile Italian quartet of Marco Belotti (1:47.37), Emiliano Brembilla (1:47.33), Massimiliano Rosolino (1:46.53), and Filippo Magnini (1:44.12) by 37-hundredths of a second, a national record of 7:05.35.

Canada's Brent Hayden (1:44.42) helped his teammates Colin Russell (1:46.89), Brian Johns (1:47.61), Brent Hayden (1:44.42), and Andrew Hurd (1:46.85) claim a fifth spot in a national record of 7:05.77. Great Britain (7:05.92), Japan (7:10.31), and South Africa (7:13.02), led by fourth-place finalist Jean Basson, rounded out the field.

Records
Prior to this competition, the existing world and Olympic records were as follows.

The following new world and Olympic records were set during this competition.

Results

Heats

Final

References

External links
Official Olympic Report

Men's freestyle relay 4 x 200 metre
4 × 200 metre freestyle relay
Men's events at the 2008 Summer Olympics